Hidișelu de Sus is a commune in Bihor County, Crișana, Romania with a population of 3,315 people. It is composed of five villages: Hidișelu de Jos (Almamező), Hidișelu de Sus, Mierlău (Nyárló), Sântelec (Biharszentelek) and Șumugiu (Váraduzsopa).

References

Communes in Bihor County
Localities in Crișana